The Pope Must Die (alternative known title as The Pope Must Diet! in the United States and Canada) is a 1991 British Catholic Church comedy film directed by Peter Richardson, who also wrote the screenplay with Pete Richens derived from elements of an earlier screenplay for a three-part mini-series satirising the Catholic Church, and which had been rejected by Channel 4. The film stars Robbie Coltrane as a low ranking priest who is mistakenly elected Pope, then has to avoid being assassinated by the Mafia. The film co-stars Adrian Edmondson, Annette Crosbie, Herbert Lom and Alex Rocco. The film was released by Palace Pictures with the backing of Channel 4 Films.

The film was originally planned as a part of a three-part mini-series for Channel 4, which was cancelled by the station after press outcry. This led Richardson to sever his long relationship with Channel 4 and move his future productions to the BBC. The budget for the film was later approved by Palace Pictures with the backing of Channel 4 Films.
The production was filmed in 1990 in Yugoslavia on a budget of £2.5 million.

The film's subject matter was controversial, which caused the distributors serious difficulties with its promotion, London Transport refusing to carry advertising for it until the film's posters were censored. In the United States the Big Three television networks refused to show commercials for the film, which they said was sacrilegious and offensive. Many newspapers in the US also censored or refused to carry advertising for the film.

Plot
The plot is predicated on the Vatican being controlled by the Mafia boss Vittorio Corelli. The movie opens with the death of the previous Pope followed by a deadlocked conclave that lasts for 25 days. The conclave is ended by the Mafia's tame Cardinal Rocco, who successfully persuades the College of Cardinals to elect in absentia the Mafia's favoured candidate to the papacy, Albini (Janez Vajevec), a priest in the service of the Mafia, whom Rocco passes off as an absent "Cardinal Albini".

Unfortunately for the Mafia, the secretary of the College of Cardinals Fr. Rookie is hard of hearing, and while recording the official results of the election, he misheard the pope-elect's name and instead of writing "Cardinal Albini" he writes down "Cardinal Albinizi" and "Albinizi" happens to be the surname of an honest parish priest, C. David "Dave" Albinizi. As a result, Fr. Albinizi becomes Pope and takes the name of Pope David I. Father Albinizi is an unorthodox priest, interested in cars, women and Rock and Roll. However, his interests in those are rather benign and not overly carnal. Prior to his ascent to the papacy, Albinizi had been a priest in an Italian orphanage, where he took a genuine interest in the children's welfare and wished them to grow up enjoying the gospel, as opposed to the curmedgeonly nuns who believe misery is deserved. Inside the Vatican, the Pope gets along with Bish, a priest in charge of coordinating the pope's security and an unnamed nun (Mirta Zecevic) assigned to bring him his meals. The pope initially considers abdicating due to a failed assassination attempt against him but is convinced by the nun to stay. As the plot develops, one of the journalists at the press conference asks the Pope to explain the corruption inside the Vatican bank. The Pope demands to see the Vatican accounts. Bish had previously received a disk upon the previous pope's death containing information about the financial irregularities and when Pope David looks into the Vatican accounts, Bish gives the disk to the pope. With Bish's help, the Pope discovers the gun-smuggling and stolen merchandise operations, and confronts Cardinal Rocco. Albinizi immediately has Rocco defrocked as punishment and to help put an end to the corruption. In revenge, Rocco persuades his mafia backers to intensify the assassination efforts against Pope David.

Together with the papal chamberlain Monsignor Fitchie, Cardinal Rocco decides to find any affair to blackmail the Pope. They find out that before joining the priesthood, Albinizi fathered a son with Veronica Dante, an American tourist. Albinizi had joined the priesthood because Veronica did not want to marry him or stay with him. Consequently, Veronica had given birth to their son, but never informed Albinizi of this. Their son is now a rock star, Joe Don Dante, dating Corelli's daughter Luccia (Khedija Sassi). Corelli doesn't approve this relationship and sends thugs to kill Joe. However, the bomb which destroys Joe's trailer kills Luccia and seriously wounds Joe who is then revealed the truth about his father. Albinizi, now Pope David I, learns about his son from Veronica and subsequently visits him before Joe dies.

Pope David learns the Vatican Bank is a tool of the Mafia, and has it dissolved. Soon after that the Pope's affair is revealed and he is forced to resign and Corelli's candidate Albini is elected Pope. Corelli and Fr. Albini move into the papal apartments. Out in the streets, Albinizi gets back with Veronica. He also finds out that the orphanage where he previously worked before becoming pope had closed. Albinizi reads the news about Albini becoming pope and rushes back to the Vatican to ask Bish to help him stop the coronation. On the way to the papal apartments the two encounter a dying Cardinal Rocco who had just been shot by Corelli. While Bish continues to the papal apartments, Rocco confesses to Albinizi who grants him absolution in his dying moments interrupted by a phone call to Rocco from his female partner. Rocco subsequently dies and Albinizi having completed the absolution rite goes to the papal chamber and finds Bish bound. Bish however tells Albinizi that the coronation was about to take place and tells him to get there fast instead of freeing him. Albinizi rushes off to the Sistine Chapel. Mons. Fitchie who had previously overheard Corelli shoot Cardinal Rocco eventually comes and frees Bish. Albinizi manages to get into the Sistine Chapel just before the end of the ceremony and reveals to the public that the man in the chapel called Albini is really Corelli in disguise. Corelli admits that there was no Cardinal Albini, declares himself as "Pope Vittorio I, Emperor of the Vatican" and draws the gun to hold Albinizi at gunpoint. He fires a few shots which hit the ceiling, causing it to collapse and bury Corelli. After Corelli is defeated, a nun (the one who served Albinizi when he was pope) is chosen to become the first female Pope in history. The new Pope (or Popess) announces that she will give the Vatican's gold to the world's poor. She also gives her blessing for Albinizi to take a bride. Albinizi and Veronica marry (with Bish as the priest), adopt the children from the orphanage and have children of their own as well.

Cast
Robbie Coltrane as Father C. David "Dave" Albinizi / The Pope (Pope David I)
Alex Rocco as Cardinal Rocco
Adrian Edmondson as Father Rookie
Paul Bartel as Monsignor Fitchie 
Peter Richardson as Bish
Annette Crosbie as Mother Superior
Herbert Lom as Vittorio Corelli
Beverly D'Angelo as Veronica Dante
Khedija Sassi as Luccia Corelli
Balthazar Getty as Joe Don Dante
Mirta Zecevic as unnamed nun/The Popess
Janez Vajevec as Father Albini
Salvatore Cascio as Paulo
Tibor Belicza as Priest in Secretariat
John Sessions as Dino

Production

Development
In 1988, Richardson pitched a proposal for a three-part mini-series to Channel 4's  Commissioning Editor for Entertainment, Seamus Cassidy. The script, co-written with Pete Richens was based around the conspiracy theories surrounding the deaths of Pope John Paul I and "God's Banker" Roberto Calvi. At the planning stages Alexei Sayle was proposed to star as 'Pope Dave the First' and Robbie Coltrane, Jennifer Saunders and Dawn French were also said to be involved. The Observer reported "The programmes would have been in the form of a parody of an American mini-series, which portrayed a modern-day Pope and his rule across two continents." The budget was said to be tabled at £1.5 million.

Plans for the series were discovered by the press, and on 28 August 1988 The Sunday Times ran a short article entitled "Row over papal satire".  The story was taken up by Catholic Herald, The Universe, The Observer and the Sun, linking the project to the furore over Martin Scorsese's The Last Temptation of Christ which at the time had been boycotted by the Catholic Church.  Cassidy took soundings from senior colleagues including Chief Executive Michael Grade, and Director of Programmes, Liz Forgan. Spokespeople from Channel 4 at first defended the production, denying it would be blasphemous, but when they came under increasing scrutiny they cancelled the project after advice from their lawyers. Instead they decided to commission one of Richardson's pet projects, a sequel to the "Five Go Mad..." Comic Strip films, entitled, "Five Go To Hell".  This project had originally been shelved due to the poor box office takings of Richardson's previous film Eat The Rich. However Five Go To Hell to date has never been filmed.

After the controversy, Richardson took the Comic Strip Presents to the BBC, reportedly because Alan Yentob was more accommodating to his ideas. He began work on another series of Comic Strip films for the channel.  Two parts of the mini series were heavily re-written and appeared as episodes of the 1990 Comic Strip series, as Oxford and Spaghetti Hoops (which featured the story of Roberto Calvi). The remainder of the material was also rewritten and submitted to Palace Pictures, who produced the film with the backing of Channel 4. A production budget of £2.5 million was approved.

Filming
Filming began in late 1990. and took place on location in Yugoslavia, where John Ebden, the production designer, constructed studio sets of the Sistine Chapel and other Vatican landmarks.
The title of the film was deemed too sensitive to be disclosed to the Yugoslavians; its working title was "Sleeping With the Fishes."

Release
The film opened on 21 June 1991 in 170 screens across the United Kingdom. It took £534,614 in its opening week and went on to earn over £1.1 million ($1,737,740) on its UK release. 
It was released in the U.S. on 2 September 1991 on a limited release across 169 screens, taking $264,147 on opening week and grossing $582,510. The film also had limited distribution in Germany where it grossed DEM 367,603 ($224,520). The film struggled to make back its £2.5 million budget, grossing $2,544,770 overall (approximately £1.7 million).

Marketing
Daniel Battsek (then managing director of Palace Pictures, which produced the film) experienced trouble over the film's promotion, when London Transport banned the movie's posters from the London Underground. 'At first they said the theme of the film was liable to cause offense," said Battsek. "When I explained the story, they admitted it was the title. We compromised with a poster saying "Robbie Coltrane in The Pope."'  The film also caused controversy when it opened in the Republic of Ireland that August.  The film encountered more serious problems with promotion on its US release, with many newspapers refusing to include adverts, and CBS, NBC and ABC refusing to air television adverts for the film. Reasons cited for this were the sacrilegious tone of the film and advertising and the possible offence this would cause to readers and audiences. A CBS spokesperson said "The decision was made because the title and content would be offensive to a significant portion of our audience." whilst NBC responded "We feel (our viewers) would be seriously offended due to the ads' sacrilegious nature"  
12 other cities newspapers accepted advertising only after the content had been heavily censored. The Washington Post accepted an advert that read "The Pope Must. . . ." The Los Angeles Times requested changes in certain captions under photos in the ad. The Chicago Tribune and Sun-Times and The New York Times were among the few newspapers which accepted advertising without alterations.

"There is a separation of church and state in this country. My question is, on what grounds have they banned these ads? It seems curious that all three (networks) are taking the same tack," said Russell Schwartz, Miramax executive vice president. "Obviously they can do what they want, they are private institutions. It just raises some interesting issues as to why, when it comes to religion, the response is so unilateral."

Critical reception
On its limited release in the United States, the film received mixed reviews. Roger Ebert of the Chicago Sun-Times wrote "The movie's basic comic approach is disrespect for the church, which almost by definition cannot be funny. To deflate a comic character, it has to first be inflated, and The Pope Must Die makes the crucial error of denying its characters dignity - so that there's no reason for us to laugh when it's taken away from them." Although he conceded "Robbie Coltrane is a British comic actor of genuine talent, but he seems under a compulsion to make bad comedies about the Catholic church" Vincent Canby of The New York Times was more enthusiastic, writing "The film is irreverent, boisterous and enjoyable even when the gags hang fire." He also praised Coltrane's performance, saying he "is very good, but the performance is somewhat restrained by the screenplay's demand that the character ultimately be heroic. In this kind of comedy, rascality gets most of the laughs." The Time Out film guide article says "There are many good laughs, albeit of a rather simple-minded nature, but even by its own ludicrous standards the plot unravels helplessly towards the end" and called the film "A pontiff's egg." (a play on the phrase a curate's egg). The film has a 33% (rotten) rating at Rotten Tomatoes, based on six reviews.

References

External links
 
 

1991 comedy films
British comedy films
The Comic Strip
Films about Catholic priests
Films about fictional popes
Films critical of the Catholic Church
Films produced by Elizabeth Karlsen
Films scored by Anne Dudley
Films set in Rome
Films set in Vatican City
Films shot in Italy
Mafia comedy films
Palace Pictures films
1990s English-language films
1990s American films
1990s British films